Stevens Peak is a 10,059-foot-elevation (3,066 meter) mountain summit located in Alpine County, California, United States.

Description
Stevens Peak is situated in the Sierra Nevada mountain range, with precipitation runoff from the peak's east slope draining to the West Fork Carson River, whereas the west slope drains into the Upper Truckee River.

History
John C. Frémont was the first European-American to see Lake Tahoe, during his second exploratory expedition. He and Charles Preuss saw the lake from the summit of what was likely Stevens Peak (or possibly Red Lake Peak) on February 14, 1844.

This landform's toponym has been officially adopted by the U.S. Board on Geographic Names, and has been in use since at least 1896 when published by the Sierra Club. The name honors Alpine County supervisor J. M. Stevens who operated a stage station in Hope Valley from 1864 through 1866. The USGS surveyed this area in 1889 and labelled the geographic feature on their map.

Climate
According to the Köppen climate classification system, Stevens Peak is located in an alpine climate zone. Most weather fronts originate in the Pacific Ocean and travel east toward the Sierra Nevada mountains. As fronts approach, they are forced upward by the peaks (orographic lift), causing them to drop their moisture in the form of rain or snowfall onto the range.

Gallery

See also
 
 Elephants Back

Notes
Lidar measurements show the summit elevation to be 10,051 feet and prominence as 549 feet.
Stevens Peak blocks some of the view of Lake Tahoe from Red Lake Peak. (Google Earth)

References

External links
 Weather forecast: Stevens Peak

North American 3000 m summits
Mountains of Northern California
Mountains of the Sierra Nevada (United States)
Mountains of Alpine County, California
Humboldt–Toiyabe National Forest